The Indian Open, titled for sponsorship reasons as the Hero Indian Open since 2011, is the national open golf championship of India, organised by the Indian Golf Union. Founded in 1964, it was added to the Asia Golf Circuit schedule in 1970. In 1998 it became an event on the rival Omega Tour (known as the Asian Tour since 2004). Since 2015, it has also been co-sanctioned by the European Tour.

From 1964 until 2000, the tournament was held exclusively at either Delhi Golf Club or Royal Calcutta Golf Club. Since then it has been held at Classic Golf Resort in 2000 and 2001, Karnataka Golf Association in 2012, and DLF Golf and Country Club in 2009 and since 2017; all other editions have been held at Delhi Golf Club.

History
The inaugural event was held in February 1964. Peter Thomson beat Ralph Moffitt by four strokes. Thomson was the inspiration behind the event. He used to stop off in India while travelling worldwide to play and soon realised the potential for golf and that the best way to promote it would be an international tournament. It was this insight that persuaded the Indian Golf Union to establish the Indian Open. Thompson continued to play in the event and won again in 1966 and 1976. His three wins was equalled by Jyoti Randhawa in 2007. 

The second event in 1965 was won by Indian amateur Prem Gopal (Billoo) Sethi, who beat Guy Wolstenholme by seven strokes. Sethi still remains the only amateur winner. It was not until 1991, when Ali Sher became champion, that India had another winner.

In 1970 the Indian Open became part of the Asia Golf Circuit; it had been an "associate event" on the circuit in 1967 and 1968. As a result of joining the tour, the field increased in strength with notable winners including three-time major champion Payne Stewart.
 
There have been a number of sponsors over the years, with Hero Honda Motors Ltd taking over sponsorship in 2005. The prize fund for 2017 was US$1.75 million.

No events took place in 2020, 2021 and 2022 because of the COVID-19 pandemic.

Venues
The following venues have been used since the founding of the Indian Open in 1964.

Winners

Source:

Notes

References

External links
Coverage on the Asian Tour's official site
Coverage on the European Tour's official site

Asia Golf Circuit events
Former Asian Tour events
European Tour events
Golf tournaments in India
Recurring sporting events established in 1964
1964 establishments in Delhi